At the end of each FIFA World Cup final tournament, several awards are presented to the players and teams who have distinguished themselves in various aspects of the game.

Awards
There are currently five post-tournament awards from the FIFA Technical Study Group:
the Golden Ball (currently commercially termed "adidas Golden Ball") for best player, first awarded in 1982; Lionel Messi is the only player in history to win the Golden Ball twice.
the Golden Boot (currently commercially termed "adidas Golden Boot", formerly known as the "adidas Golden Shoe" from 1982 to 2006) for top goalscorer, first awarded in 1982;
the Golden Glove (currently commercially termed "adidas Golden Glove", formerly known as the "Lev Yashin Award" from 1994 to 2006) for best goalkeeper, first awarded in 1994;
the FIFA Young Player Award (formerly known as the "Best Young Player Award" from 2006 to 2010) for best player under 21 years of age at the start of the calendar year, first awarded in 2006;
the FIFA Fair Play Trophy for the team that advanced to the second round with the best record of fair play, first awarded in 1970.
There is currently one award voted on by fans during the tournament:
the Player of the Match  (currently commercially termed "Budweiser Player of the Match", formerly known as the "Man of the Match" from 2002 to 2018) for outstanding performance during each match of the tournament, first awarded in 2002.
There are currently two awards voted on by fans after the conclusion of the tournament:
the Goal of the Tournament, (currently commercially termed "Hyundai Goal of the Tournament") for the fans' best goal scored during the tournament, first awarded in 2006;
the Most Entertaining Team for the team that has entertained the public the most, during the World Cup final tournament, as determined by a poll of the general public.
One other award was given between 1994 and 2006:
an All-Star Team comprising the best players of the tournament chosen by the FIFA Technical Study Group. From 2010 onwards, all Dream Teams or Statistical Teams are unofficial, as reported by FIFA itself.

Golden Ball

The Golden Ball award is presented to the best player at each FIFA World Cup finals, with a shortlist drawn up by the FIFA technical committee (Technical Study Group) and the winner voted for by representatives of the media. Those who finish as runners-up in the vote receive the Silver Ball and Bronze Ball awards as the second and third most outstanding players in the tournament respectively. The current award was introduced in the 1982 FIFA World Cup, sponsored by Adidas and France Football. Oliver Kahn is to date the only goalkeeper to have won the award, which he did in the FIFA World Cup 2002. At the 2022 FIFA World Cup, Lionel Messi became the first player to win two Golden Balls.

Official winners

Unofficial winner
The following players were recognised as best players by FIFA website. Also, FIFA only recognizes the 1978 Golden Ball award prior to 1982. FIFA does not recognize Golden Ball awards from 1930 to 1974.

Media's selections
Authoritative football historian and statistician Ejikeme Ikwunze, popularly called "Mr. Football", published a list of the best players in his book World Cup (1930-2010): A Statistical Summary, and it gained the most attention among experts' selections about the best players until 1978. This work is part of the official FIFA library, and received public recognition from his former presidents Joao Havelange and Joseph Blatter. A considerable number of other media agreed with him.

{| class="wikitable"
|+''World Cup (1930-2010): A Statistical Summarys Best Player
|-
!World Cup
!scope=col style="background-color: gold" | First place
!scope=col style="background-color: silver" | Second place
!scope=col style="background-color: #cc9966" | Third place
|-
|align=left|1930 Uruguay
| José Nasazzi
| Guillermo Stábile
| José Leandro Andrade
|-
|align=left|1934 Italy
| Giuseppe Meazza
| Matthias Sindelar
| Oldrich Nejedly
|-
|align=left|1938 France
| Leônidas
| Silvio Piola
| György Sárosi
|-
|align=left|1950 Brazil
| Zizinho
| Juan Alberto Schiaffino
|align="center"|did not select
|-
|align=left|1954 Switzerland
| Ferenc Puskas
| Sandor Kocsis
| Fritz Walter
|-
|align=left|1958 Sweden
| Didi
| Pelé
| Just Fontaine
|-
|align=left|1962 Chile
| Garrincha
| Josef Masopust
| Leonel Sánchez
|-
|align=left|1966 England
| Bobby Charlton
| Bobby Moore
|align="center"|did not select
|-
|align=left|1970 México
| Pelé
| Gérson
| Gerd Müller
|- 
|align=left|1974 West Germany
| Johan Cruyff
| Franz Beckenbauer
| Kazimierz Deyna
|-
|align=left|1978 Argentina
| Mario Kempes
| Paolo Rossi
|align="center"|did not select
|}

France Football, the sponsor of Golden Ball and Ballon d'Or, selected the best player of the 1966 FIFA World Cup at that time with L'Équipe, and Bobby Charlton became the winner.

After the 1978 World Cup Argentinian magazine El Gráfico held a survey for the best player of the tournament. This was different from the unofficial Golden Ball which is recognised by FIFA.

Guerin Sportivo chose their top 10 player for the 1990 tournament in Italy.

In 1998 the Argentinian newspaper Clarín provided a brief description of each star player dating back to 1930. Some are controversial decisions as is the case with retrospective awards. The 1998 winner was awarded after the tournament ended.

Golden Boot

The Golden Boot or Golden Shoe award goes to the top goalscorer of the FIFA World Cup. While every World Cup had a ranking of the goalscorers, the first time an award was given was in 1982, under the name Golden Shoe. It was rechristened Golden Boot in 2010. FIFA sometimes lists the top goalscorers of previous Cups among the Golden Boot winners.

If there is more than one player with the same number of goals, since 1994 the tie-breaker goes to the player with more assists. If there is still more than one player, the tie (since 2006) is decided by minutes played in the tournament, with the player playing fewest minutes ranked first. A Silver Boot and a Bronze Boot are also awarded for the second and third-highest goalscorers respectively.

Golden Glove

The Golden Glove award is awarded to the best goalkeeper of the tournament. The award was introduced with the name "Lev Yashin Award" in 1994, in honor of the late Soviet goalkeeper. It was rechristened "Golden Glove" in 2010. The FIFA Technical Study Group recognises the top goalkeeper of the tournament based on the player's performance throughout the final competition. Although goalkeepers have this specific award for their position, they are still eligible for the Golden Ball as well, as when Oliver Kahn was awarded in 2002.

FIFA Young Player Award

The FIFA Young Player Award ("Best Young Player Award" 2006–2010) was awarded for the first time at the 2006 World Cup in Germany and given to Germany's Lukas Podolski. The award is given to the best player in the tournament who is at most 21 years old.  For the 2022 World Cup, this meant that the player had to have been born on or after 1 January 2001.

In 2006, the election took place on FIFA's official World Cup website with the help of The FIFA Technical Study Group.

FIFA organised a survey on the Internet for users to choose the "Best Young Player" of the World Cup, between 1958 and 2002, named the best young player of each tournament. With 61% of the overall vote, the winner was Pelé, who finished ahead of the Peruvian Teófilo Cubillas, the best young player at Mexico 1970, and England's Michael Owen, who reached similar heights at France 98.

The winner of the award has only been part of the winning country three times. Pelé in 1958, Kylian Mbappé in 2018, and Enzo Fernández in 2022.

FIFA Fair Play Trophy

The FIFA Fair Play Trophy is given to the team with the best record of fair play during the World Cup final tournament since 1970. Only teams that qualified for the second round are considered. The winners of this award earn the FIFA Fair Play Trophy, a diploma, a fair play medal for each player and official, and $50,000 worth of football equipment to be used for youth development.

The appearance of the award was originally a certificate. From 1982 to 1990, it was a golden trophy based on Sport Billy, a football-playing cartoon character from 1982 who became an icon for FIFA Fair play.1982 Technical Report, page 222: "Sport Billy - the FIFA Fair Play Trophy" Ever since 1994, it is simply a trophy with an elegant footballer figure. Peru was the first nation to win the award after receiving no yellow or red cards in the 1970 FIFA World Cup held in Mexico.

Player of the Match
The Player of the Match (POTM) award picks the outstanding player in every match of the tournament. The award was introduced with the name "Man of the Match" in 2002. It was rechristened "Player of the Match" in 2022.

While the inaugural two editions were chosen by the technical group, since 2010, Player of the Match is picked by an online poll on FIFA's website.Total awardsAs of 18 December 2022By countryAs of 18 December 2022

Most Entertaining Team
The Most Entertaining Team award is a subjectively awarded prize for the team that had done the most to entertain the public with a positive approach to the game, organised through public participation in a poll starting in 1994.

All-Star Team
Official winners
The All-Star Team is a team of the best performers at the respective World Cup finals. Since 1994, FIFA decided to add official best squads, chosen by its Technical Study Group under the brand name MasterCard All-Star Team. For 1998, 2002 and 2006, substitute and reserve members were also nominated for full squads.

 Unofficial winners 
FIFA published the first All-Star Team in 1938, but it never made All-Star Team again until 1990 due to ensuing complaints. In January 1959, the host of 1958 tournament Swedish Federation published an All-Star Team based on 720 answers out of 1,200 experts. In 1990 there was an All-Star Team announced in combination with the Golden Ball ceremony. It was chosen by the same journalists who chose the best player, but this team is still considered unofficial.

After FIFA changed its sponsor from MasterCard to Visa in 2007, it published Team of the Tournament based on statistical data of other sponsors, which evaluates players' performances. FIFA explained these are not official.

Since 2010, the Fan Dream Team has been voted by online poll of FIFA website, but FIFA explained this is also not official team.

 Media's selections 
Many different newspapers, sports journalists, managers and former players have picked their All-Star teams for the tournaments over the years. Newspapers which picked their All-Star teams include Sport-Magazin, Mundo Esportivo, France Football, Associated Press, Estadio, El Gráfico, Goles, Guerin Sportivo, Crónica, El Mercurio, La Prensa, Clarín, La Razón, El País, L'Équipe, Mundo Deportivo, De Volkskrant, La Gazzetta dello Sport, Don Balón, La Stampa, Kicker, Deporte Gráfico, Spotivo Sur, Match, Fußball Woche, Placar, Shoot!, BBC Sport, Süddeutsche Zeitung, Diario AS and Marca.

Sports journalists, managers and former players who picked their All-Star teams include Dr. Friedebert Becker, Gabriel Hanot, Enzo Bearzot, Pelé, Roberto Bettega, Eugenio Bersellini, Giovanni Trapattoni, Massimo Giacomini, Sandro Mazzola, Paolo Carosi, Jimmy Greaves, Pichi Alonso and Johan Cruyff.

Since the beginning many newspapers gave players points to players based on their performances at the World Cup. Some are based in statistics, but some were just rankings given by experts. Castrol Football has given retrospective rankings to players until 1966 with their expert panel consisting of people such as Cristiano Ronaldo, Arsène Wenger, Marcel Desailly, Cafu, Alan Shearer, Emilio Butragueño, Ronald Koeman, Pierluigi Collina, Ottmar Hitzfeld, Gary Bailey, Peter Stöger, Mohamed Al-Deayea and Stanislav Levý. 

Goal of the Tournament
The Goal of the Tournament''' award was awarded for the first time at the 2006 FIFA World Cup.
 Scores and results list the goal tally of the players' team first.

Official winners

Unofficial winners 
In 2020 and 2021, FIFA's official YouTube channel made videos of the top ten goals of the following three tournaments.

Nominees

See also
 FIFA Women's World Cup awards
 UEFA European Championship awards
 Copa América awards
 Africa Cup of Nations awards
 AFC Asian Cup awards
 CONCACAF Gold Cup awards
 OFC Nations Cup awards

References

Bibliography

External links
 FIFA World Cup Awards on FIFA website

Awards
World Cup
Top sports lists